Lamb Weston Holdings, Inc. is an American food processing company that is one of the world's largest producers and processors of frozen french fries, waffle fries, and other frozen potato products.  It is headquartered in Eagle, Idaho, a suburb of Boise.

History
The company was founded in 1950 by Gilbert Lamb in a former co-op plant in Weston, Oregon. In 1988, it was acquired by ConAgra Foods and moved corporate offices from Tigard, Oregon to Kennewick, Washington. In November 2016, ConAgra spun off the company to its shareholders. In October 2019, Lamb Weston formed the joint venture, Lamb Weston Alimentos Modernos S.A., with Sociedad Comercial del Plata.

Subsidiaries
Lamb Weston Holdings has subsidiaries in Europe, Asia and Southern America.

Companies

 China  - Lamb Weston - Shanghai, two processing plants
 China -  TaiMei Potato Industry
 Europe - Lamb Weston / Meijer: joint venture of Lamb Weston Holdings (U.S.) and Meijer Beheer B.V. (Netherlands), six processnig plants in the Netherlands, United Kingdom, Austria and Russia 
 United States -  Alexia Foods
 Canada  - Lamb Weston Canada ULC
 Chile - Unisur Alimentos Ltda
 Argentina -  Lamb Weston Alimentos Modernos S.A.

Processing plants
Lamb Weston
 American Falls (Idaho)
 Boardman East (Oregon)
 Boardman West (Oregon)
 Connell (Washington)
 Delhi (Louisiana)
 Hallam (Australia)
 Hermiston (Oregon)
 Pasco (Washington)
 Paterson (Washington)
 Lamb Weston RDO Frozen - Park Rapids (Minnesota)
 Quincy (Washington)
 Richland (Washington)
 Shangdu (China)
 Taber (Canada)
 Twin Falls (Idaho)
 Warden (Washington)

Lamb Weston/Meijer (1994-2022)
 Bergen op Zoom (the Netherlands)
 Frisch & Frost, Hollabrunn (Austria)
 Kruiningen (the Netherlands)
 Lipetsk (Russia)
 Oosterbierum (the Netherlands)
 Wisbech (the United Kingdom)

In 2022 Lamb Weston / Meijer sold it's Russian plant to local shareholders and later Meijer Beheer B.V. sold his share of ownership to Lamb Weston Holdings Inc.

Lamb Weston Alimentos Modernos S.A.
 Munro (Argentina)

References

External links
 

Corporate spin-offs
Companies listed on the New York Stock Exchange
Food and drink companies established in 1950
Food and drink companies based in Idaho
1950 establishments in Idaho
Companies based in Boise, Idaho
1988 mergers and acquisitions